Agrahari, Agraharee or Agarhari is an Indian and Nepali Vaishya community, They are the descendants of legendary king Agrasena. Predominantly, they are found in the Indian state of Uttar Pradesh, Madhya Pradesh, Jharkhand, Chhattisgarh and Terai region of Nepal.

History
In 1916, Robert Vane Russell, an ethnologist of the British Raj period wrote, Agrahari, a sub caste of Bania found chiefly Jubbulpore district and Raigarh State. Their name connected with the cities with Agra and Agroha.

William Crooke states that Agrahari claim partly a Vaishya and partly a Brāhmanical descent, and wear the sacred thread. Like that of the Agarwāla Banias their name has been connected with the cities of Agra and Agroha. There is no doubt that they are closely connected with the Agarwālas.

In Chhattisgarh, Central Provinces of British India, some of few Agrahari were Malgujars/Zamindars. The ruler of Raigarh awarded the title Shaw to Agraharis. The title still continues.

Agrahari Sikhs

Most of the Agraharis follow Hinduism, although some are Sikhs. The majority of Agrahari Sikhs are found in the Eastern Indian state of Bihar Jharkhand and West Bengal. Author Himadri Banerjee wrote in his book "The Other Sikhs: A View from Eastern India", that Agraharis converted to Sikhism during Mughal period by Guru Tegh Bahadur Ji, 9th Guru of the Sikhs.  Mughal rulers were enforcing Hindus to convert to Islam, but Agraharis refused to convert to Islam and they accepted Khalsa Panth, led by Guru Tegh Bahadur Ji for protecting their life and religion.
Other legend says that Agrahari Sikhs are a community of Ahom converts to Sikhism from the time of 9th Guru Tegh Bahadur Ji’s travel to Assam. They are also known as "Bihari Sikhs" having lived for centuries in Bihar.
They are running several separate Gurudwara in Bihar and West Bengal. The majority of these Sikhs are found in Sasaram, Gaya and Kolkata of Bihar and West Bengal. In Jharkhand they are found in Dumari Kalan and Kedli Chatti. Agrahari Sikhs  also moved Eastwards of India, they are also found in the Indian State of Uttar Pradesh.  Agrahari Sikhs are of the non-Punjabi background.

Surname, Gotra & title
Agrahari often use their community name as surname. However, many people using Gupta, Bania or Baniya, Thagunna, Patwari or Vanik or Banik, Shaw and Vaishya or Vaishy or Vaish or Baishya or Baish.  They have a common gotra, the Kashyap.

Reservation
The Mandal Commission designated the Agrahari's of Uttar Pradesh and other states as General, but Agrahari in Bihar and Jharkhand are designated as Other Backwards Class  in the Indian caste system of positive discrimination.

See also
 List of Agrahari people
 Agrasen Jayanti
 Agrahari Sikh

References

Social groups of Uttar Pradesh
Social groups of Bihar
Social groups of Uttarakhand
Social groups of Delhi
Social groups of West Bengal
Social groups of Nepal
Bania communities
 
People from Hisar district